Intersection syndrome is a painful condition that affects the lateral side of the forearm when inflammation occurs at the intersection of the muscle bellies of the abductor pollicis longus and extensor pollicis brevis cross over the extensor carpi radialis longus and the extensor carpi radialis brevis. These 1st and 2nd dorsal muscle compartments intersect at this location, hence the name. The mechanism of injury is usually repetitive resisted extension, as with rowing, weight lifting, or pulling.

Intersection syndrome is often confused with another condition called DeQuervain's syndrome, which is an irritation of the thumb-sided set of tendons at the wrist, called the first dorsal compartment.

References

External links 

Syndromes with musculoskeletal abnormalities